Mountain King is a scrolling platform game released by CBS Electronics in 1983. It was available on the Atari 2600, Atari 5200, Atari 8-bit family, ColecoVision, Commodore 64, and VIC-20.

Gameplay

The player takes the role of an explorer searching a diamond mine and the temple of an ancient civilization. The object of the game is to discover and collect the Golden Crown and take it to the peak of the mountain.

The mountain environment is made up of platforms and ladders, with the Perpetual Flame located on the top of the summit. This is where the Golden Crown must be taken. To retrieve the Crown, the player must first collect one thousand points. Diamonds are worth 25 points each and treasure chests are worth 260 points. Diamonds are scattered throughout the level, and treasure chests can be located by using the explorer's flashlight to see in the darkness. While it is not necessary for the player to descend to the very bottom of the mountain, there are many treasure chests to find there, but these resources are not without peril: a giant spider lurks in the lowest level, and will give chase if the player spends more than a few seconds exploring the bottom. Once the player has the required score, they must locate the Flame Spirit by following the musical cues. The Flame Spirit is the key to the Temple Chamber, where the Crown is kept. If the player attempts to enter the Temple before they have the Flame Spirit, the Skull Spirit guarding the entrance will stop him. When the Temple Chamber is unlocked, the player can collect the Crown and take it to the Perpetual Flame - however, there will now be Cave Bats stalking the player. If they touch the crown, they will steal it, and the player will have to start collecting points again.

There are three ways to lose the game. The first and most probable conclusion to the game is the expiration of the timer. When time reaches zero, the game is over. The second, more unfortunate fate involves the giant spider. If the spider catches the player on the lowest level, the player is trapped in a web cocoon. The player can escape from this web by rapidly moving the joystick left and right. If the player does not escape by the time the spider returns, the game will end, ostensibly with the player having been eaten by the spider. The third, when the player touches any regular fires, they shall die and the game will end.

Hidden level 
Mountain King has a hidden level (called Glitch Heaven) which can be reached by jumping from the tip of a ledge located on the mountain peak at the top of the game screen. Timed correctly, the player will catch the very bottom rung of a higher ladder. The ladder leads into a hidden level of ladders and platforms. At the very top of this area are two strange ghost-like figures, but there is no reward or bonus for entering this level, and the level is extremely difficult to navigate (with falling from the various ladders a common occurrence).

Soundtrack
The game prominently features Edvard Grieg's 1875 composition, In the Hall of the Mountain King from Peer Gynt, after collecting the Golden Crown.

Reception
Softline stated that Mountain King is "a game worth playing" which "is also something more [than a game], something like a fantasy or adventure". Antic praised Mountain King for its gameplay and intelligent use of music and sound.

References

1983 video games
Atari 8-bit family games
Atari 2600 games
Atari 5200 games
ColecoVision games
Commodore 64 games
VIC-20 games
Platform games
Video games developed in the United States
Video games about spiders